In the 1852 Iowa State Senate elections, Iowa voters elected state senators to serve in the fourth Iowa General Assembly. Following the expansion of the Iowa Senate from 19 to 31 seats in 1852, elections were held for 22 of the state senate's 31 seats. State senators serve four-year terms in the Iowa State Senate.

The general election took place in 1852.

Following the previous election in 1850, Democrats had control of the Iowa Senate with 14 seats to Whigs' five seats.

To claim control of the chamber from Democrats, the Whigs needed to net 11 Senate seats.

Democrats maintained control of the Iowa State Senate following the 1852 general election with the balance of power shifting to Democrats holding 20 seats and Whigs having 11 seats (a net gain of 6 seats for both Democrats and Whigs). Democratic Senator William E. Leffingwell was chosen as the President of the Iowa Senate for the fourth General Assembly, succeeding Democratic Senator Enos Lowe in that leadership position.

Summary of Results 

Source:

Detailed Results
NOTE: The Iowa General Assembly does not provide detailed vote totals for Iowa State Senate elections in 1852.

See also
 Elections in Iowa

External links
District boundaries were redrawn before the 1852 general election for the Iowa Senate:
Iowa Senate Districts 1850-1851 map
Iowa Senate Districts 1852-1855 map

References

Iowa Senate
Iowa
Iowa Senate elections